Dilara Begum is a Bangladesh Awami League politician and the former Member of Bangladesh Parliament from a reserved seat.

Early life
Begum was born on 7 January 1954. She has a B.A. and B.Ed. degrees.

Career
Begum was elected to parliament from reserved seat as a Bangladesh Awami League candidate in 2014.

References

Awami League politicians
Living people
1954 births
Women members of the Jatiya Sangsad
10th Jatiya Sangsad members
21st-century Bangladeshi women politicians
21st-century Bangladeshi politicians